Kingbirds are birds of the genus Tyrannus in the tyrant flycatcher family.

Kingbird may also refer to:

Curtiss Kingbird, an airplane built in the early 1930s
USS Kingbird, several ships with the same name
The Kingbird, the scholarly journal of the New York State Ornithological Association

See also
King of Birds (disambiguation)